The Flora Europaea is a 5-volume encyclopedia of plants, published between 1964 and 1993 by Cambridge University Press. The aim was to describe all the national Floras of Europe in a single, authoritative publication to help readers identify any wild or widely cultivated plant in Europe to the subspecies level. It also provides information on geographical distribution, habitat preference, and chromosome number, where known.

The Flora was released in CD form in 2001, and the  Royal Botanic Garden Edinburgh have made an index to the plant names available online.

History
The idea of a pan-European Flora was first mooted at the 8th International Congress of Botany in Paris in 1954. In 1957, Britain's Science and Engineering Research Council provided grants to fund a secretariat of three people, and Volume 1 was published in 1964. More volumes were issued in the following years, culminating in 1980 with the monocots of Volume 5. The royalties were put into a trust fund administered by the Linnean Society, which allowed funding for Dr John Akeroyd to continue work on the project.  A revised Volume 1 was launched at the Linnean Society on 11 March 1993.

Volumes

Volume 1 : Lycopodiaceae to Platanaceae
Published 1964

Volume 2: Rosaceae to Umbelliferae

Published : 1 Dec 1968 (486 pages)

Volume 3: Diapensiaceae to Myoporaceae

Published : 28 Dec 1972 (399 pages)

Volume 4: Plantaginaceae to Compositae (and Rubiaceae)

Published: 5 Aug 1976 (534 pages)

Volume 5: Alismataceae to Orchidaceae

Published: 3 April 1980 (476 pages)

Volume 1 Revised: Lycopodiaceae to Platanaceae

Published: 22 April 1993 (629 pages)

5 Volume Set and CD-ROM Pack

Published: 6 Dec 2001 (2392 pages)

Editors
The editors named on every edition are :

Tom Tutin (1908–1987) – Professor of Botany at University of Leicester
Vernon Heywood (b. 1927) – Chief Scientist, Plant Conservation, IUCN and professor emeritus at University of Reading
Alan Burges (1911–2002) – Professor of Botany at University of Liverpool
David Valentine (1912–1987) – Professor of Botany at Durham University until 1966, then at University of Manchester

For the Revised Edition of Volume 1 only :
David Moore (1933–2013) – Professor Emeritus at University of Reading

For the CD set only :
Max Walters (1920–2005) – Director, Cambridge University Botanic Garden
David Webb (1912–1994) – Professor of Botany at Trinity College, Dublin

Regional advisers
A panel of regional advisers was formed, in order to ensure full coverage of the whole of Europe. Several of the advisers were also authors in their respective taxonomic specialities. For each country the representatives were:

See also
 Species Plantarum – the first attempt at an encyclopedia of plants

Geographical Codes
The geographical distribution is indicated by a series of two letter codes.

References

External links
Flora Europaea front matter at Cambridge U P
 Flora Europaea — online edition (database)
 Atlas Florae Europaea Helsinki-based group creating maps to complement the Flora Europaea

Europaea
.
Biological databases
.
Databases in the United Kingdom
Online botany databases
British online encyclopedias
1964 non-fiction books
1968 non-fiction books
1972 non-fiction books
1976 non-fiction books
1980 non-fiction books
1993 non-fiction books
2001 non-fiction books